The Levasseur PL.4, aka Levasseur Marin, was a carrier-based reconnaissance aircraft produced in France in the 1920s.

Design and development
The PL.4 was a conventional, single-bay biplane that carried a crew of three in tandem, open cockpits. Purchased by the Aéronavale to operate from the aircraft carrier Béarn, it incorporated several safety features in case of ditching at sea. Apart from small floats attached directly to the undersides of the lower wing, the main units of the fixed, tailskid undercarriage could be jettisoned in flight, and the underside of the fuselage was given a boat-like shape and made watertight.

Variants
PL.4 A3 R3b to meet the 1924 A.3/R.3b (three seat observation and gunnery spotter aircraft) specification from the Service technique de l'aéronautique (STAé); 1 built.
PL.4 3-seat shipboard reconnaissance aircraft for the Aéronautique Navale; 40 built.

Operators
 
 Aéronavale
 Escadrille 7R1

Specifications (PL.4)

See also

References

Further reading

 
 

Levasseur aircraft
1920s French military reconnaissance aircraft
Carrier-based aircraft
Biplanes
Single-engined tractor aircraft
Aircraft first flown in 1926